BBC Lausanne (Basket Ball Club Lausanne)  is a Swiss basketball club from Lausanne.

History
The club was founded on November 25, 1929  under the name L'epi sport Lausanne and was the first basketball club in the city. In the 1950s, the name change to Sanas Merry Boys. Since 2010, the club is called BBC Lausanne.

In 2014, the club was in debt. According to the club president in 2016, the club sought a budget between 400,000 and 800,000 Swiss francs to finish the 2016–17 season in the top 6 of the LNA. After completing the first qualifying round, BBC Lausanne took the 6th place.

Honours
 Swiss League
 Winners (2): 1951–52, 1963–64
 Swiss Cup
 Winners (6): 1945–46, 1954–55, 1955–56, 1956–57, 1958–59, 1962–63

References

Basketball teams in Switzerland
Sport in Lausanne
1929 establishments in Switzerland